Petrus Johannes Maria "Peer" Mascini (23 March 1941 – 16 May 2019) was a Dutch actor and writer. He is well known for his work in Blind Date (1996) and  De eenzame oorlog van Koos Tak (1996). He was a recipient of Golden Calf award.

Career 

For many years Mascini was part of the theater group Hauser Orkater.

In 1996, he won the Golden Calf for Best Actor award at the Netherlands Film Festival for his role in the film Blind Date by Theo van Gogh. Mascini wrote the film together with Van Gogh and Renée Fokker. Mascini also played a role in the 2007 English-language remake Blind Date by Stanley Tucci.

In the Netherlands he is known for his role in Melkunie television commercials and in particular a 1997 commercial which won the Gouden Loeki award for best Dutch commercial of the year. In the commercial Mascini becomes wet as a result of a cow jumping into a swimming pool and his response "Nog zo gezegd: geen bommetje!" (Dutch for "As I clearly said: no cannonball!") became a well-known phrase in the Netherlands. The Melkunie brand was discontinued in 2001 and reintroduced in 2012. Mascini reappeared in various commercials as part of the brand's relaunch.

Death 

Mascini died on 16 May 2019.

Awards 

 1996: Golden Calf for Best Actor, Blind Date

Selected filmography 

 1983: De Lift
 1986: Abel
 1991: Oh Boy!
 1992: Ik ga naar Tahiti
 1995: Filmpje!
 1996: Blind Date
 1998: Het 14e kippetje
 1999: Jesus is a Palestinian
 1999: No Trains No Planes
 2006: Het Woeden der Gehele Wereld
 2007: Blind Date

References

External links 
 

1941 births
2019 deaths
20th-century Dutch male actors
21st-century Dutch male actors
Dutch male actors
Dutch male film actors
Dutch male television actors
Golden Calf winners